Cindy Harrison is an American politician currently serving as a Connecticut State Representative representing the 69th district. Which includes the towns of Bridgewater, Roxbury, Washington and part of Southbury. A member of the Republican Party, Harrison was first elected to the seat in 2020. Harrison currently serves as a member of the House Appropriations Committee, Transportation Committee, and Environment Committee.

Personal life
Harrison was born in Newtown, Connecticut. She earned a Bachelor's degree in accounting from Upsala College and a Master's degree in finance from UConn.

References

Members of the Connecticut General Assembly